Cortinarius canabarba is a fungus of the genus Cortinarius native to Europe. It was described by Austrian mycologist Meinhard Michael Moser in 1966.

References

External links

canabarba
Fungi of Europe
Fungi described in 1966
Taxa named by Meinhard Michael Moser